Clement Field "Clem" Kimball (August 11, 1868 – September 10, 1928) was an American Republican politician and lawyer.

Biography
Born in Anamosa, Iowa, Kimball went to what is now Iowa State University and received his degree in mechanical engineering. After being in business and teaching, Kimball went to University of Michigan and received his law degree. He then went to Council Bluffs, Iowa to practice law. He served in the Iowa State Senate and was Lieutenant Governor of Iowa serving under Governor John Hammill from 1925 until 1928, when he died in office in Council Bluffs.

References

1868 births
1928 deaths
People from Anamosa, Iowa
Politicians from Council Bluffs, Iowa
Iowa State University alumni
Iowa lawyers
Republican Party Iowa state senators
Lieutenant Governors of Iowa
University of Michigan Law School alumni
19th-century American lawyers